Šebesta (feminine Šebestová) is a Czech and Slovakian version of Silesian and Moravian surname. German version Schebesta and Polish Szebesta. Notable people with the surname include:

 Agnese Schebest (1813–1869), Austrian operatic mezzo-soprano
 Andrea Šebestová (born 1978), Czech gymnast
 Daniel Šebesta (born 1991), Slovak footballer
 Fred Schebesta, Australian comparison website Finder founder
 Jakub Šebesta (born 1948), Czech politician
 Jim Sebesta (born 1935), American politician

See also 
 Mach a Šebestová, Czech cartoon series

Czech-language surnames